David Shae (also known as David Moretti) (born September 3, 1981)) is an American actor. He is best known for playing Ron Martz, in Clint Eastwood's Richard Jewell and Alfred on The Walking Dead.

Early life 
Shae was born in Cranston, Rhode Island and graduated from the University of Southern California in 2002 with a degree in English. He was a member of the Delta Chi fraternity.

Career 
His first major network production was an episode of House Of Cards, playing Buha - press secretary to Joel Kinnaman - in an episode directed by Robin Wright. This led to more television gigs, such as The Walking Dead, The Haunting of Hill House, Dynasty, and many others. From there, David began entering the world of feature films, with a supporting role in Gemini Man, directed by the Oscar winning director Ang Lee. His breakout role was in Clint Eastwood's Richard Jewell, playing Ron Martz opposite Olivia Wilde's Kathy Scruggs.

Personal life 

David is currently based in Atlanta, GA. His first taste of acting was in High School, with in his sketch group The Blueberry Johnsons. David and his best friends wrote and performed SNL style sketches, touring the local club scene in Providence, RI. From there, David moved to Los Angeles, embarking on the path to a professional career. He was accepted to the University of Southern California, where he lived off-campus in the Delta Chi fraternity house. He completed his college curriculum during the day, followed by acting classes at night. His mentors included the likes of Janet Alhanti, Margie Haber, and Ivana Chubbuck. While not working, he is involved with local charitable pursuits, such as using 'improv as therapy' to children with behavioral complications. He also immerses himself in anything animal related, as his rescued dog Tess has been by his side for 13 years now, enriching his life immeasurably.

Filmography

References

External links

Windy City Times interview
2009 "Talking About: David Moretti" interview

1981 births
Living people
American gay actors
People from Cranston, Rhode Island
Male actors from Rhode Island
American male film actors
American male television actors
University of Southern California alumni
21st-century American LGBT people